Ethel Clara Neave (21 January 1883 – 9 August 1967), known as Ethel Le Neve, was the mistress of Dr. Hawley Harvey Crippen, a homeopath hanged for the murder and mutilation of his wife in 1910.

She was born in Diss, Norfolk, the eldest child of Walter William Neave, a railway clerk, and Charlotte Anne Neave (née Jones), Ethel was hired as a typist by Crippen in 1900, and was his mistress by 1905.

Scotland Yard sent Chief Inspector Walter Dew to arrest them upon their arrival in Canada. Returned to England, she was exonerated of the charge of complicity to murder.

Between his conviction and execution Crippen made a will, appointing Le Neve his executrix and leaving all his estate to her. Crippen's wife had died intestate, and Le Neve applied for letters of administration of her estate. The probate court refused her application on the ground that, as Crippen would not have been permitted to profit from murdering his wife, anyone claiming under him was also debarred from benefiting from his crime.

After the trial, Le Neve travelled to Toronto, working as a typist there for three years before returning to London under the name Ethel Harvey. While working at Hampton's furniture store off Trafalgar Square, she met and in January 1915 married Stanley Smith, with whom she had two children. They lived in Croydon, where Ethel died in 1967.

References

Further reading
 

1883 births
1967 deaths
People from Diss, Norfolk